Upasana Singh (born 29 June 1975) is an Indian actress and stand-up comedian who works in Hindi and Punjabi language films.

Singh is known for her role as a deaf-mute in the 1997 film Judaai. Later on, she got famous for her negative portrayal in Son Pari as Cruella/Kalipari, a dark fairy. Her comedic role as Gangaa in patriotic sitcom on Doordarshan's Phir Bhi Dil Hai Hindustani and Zee thriller show Tamanna House. Later on, she played small roles in Priyadarshan's and David Dhawan's films as a regular cast.

She played the character of "Bua" (paternal aunt) in the TV show Comedy Nights with Kapil which got her widespread critical acclaim. She is popular for her onscreen style and Punjabi and funny English dialogue delivery. She has done numerous Bollywood films as well as regional cinema such as Punjabi, Bhojpuri, Rajasthani and Gujarati.

Career
Singh debuted in the 1986 Hindi movie Babul as the leading lady under the banner of Rajshri Productions. Thereafter, she appeared in the 1988 film Bai Chali Sasariye, which was revolutionary for Rajasthani cinema. Since then, she has acted in many regional films and is a known face in the Punjabi, Gujarati and Hindi film industry. She has also done numerous supporting roles for films such as Darr, Jawani Zindabad, Loafer, Judaai, Main Prem Ki Diwani Hoon, Mujhse Shaadi Karogi, Aitraaz, Old Is Gold, My Friend Ganesha, Golmaal Returns and Hungama.

Singh is also known for her comic roles in films and television and she has also appeared in many popular series like Raja Ki Aayegi Baraat, Pari Hoon Main, Maayka, Ye Meri Life Hai, Bani - Ishq Da Kalma and Sonpari.  Singh became a household name with her stint as Tarawanti on Nadaniyaan and the desperate "Bua" (paternal aunt) in the hit TV show Comedy Nights with Kapil, particularly for her trademark dialogue "Bittu, Kaun hai ye aadmi?" (Bittu, who is this man?). Singh has also acted in Bollywood comedy movies such as Mujhse Shaadi Karogi and Golmaal Returns. In 2015, she played the role of Manjeet in Chalk N Duster, alongside Juhi Chawla, Shabana Azmi and Girish Karnad.

In 2017, Singh bagged a role in Judwaa 2, alongside Varun Dhawan, Jacqueline Fernandez and Taapsee Pannu.

She has also been a part of the sequel of the popular Punjabi film Carry On Jatta, which was one of the highest grossing Punjabi films in India. The movie stars Gippy Grewal, Sonam Bajwa and Jaswinder Bhalla. She is currently playing the role of Panchami (Bebe), Pancham's mother SAB TV's comedy serial Jijaji Chhat Per Hain. She returned to television in Gangs of Filmistan.

Personal life
Singh is married to actor Neeraj Bharadwaj, who has acted in many serials on Doordarshan and a few Hindi and Bhojpuri films as a hero and negative character too. They met and decided to get married, when working together for the serial Aye Dil-e-Nadaan.

Filmography

Films

Television

References

External links 
 
 

Living people
1970 births
People from Hoshiarpur
Actresses from Punjab, India
Indian film actresses
Indian television actresses
Indian soap opera actresses
Actresses in Punjabi cinema
Actresses in Hindi cinema
Actresses in Bengali cinema
Actresses in Hindi television
Punjabi people
Indian women comedians
Indian stand-up comedians
Women humorists
20th-century Indian actresses
21st-century Indian actresses